Three referendums were held in Liechtenstein during 1961. The first was held on 12 March on the creation of a new tax law, and was approved by 66.7% of voters. The second was held on 8 August on an initiative on the law on land surveying, and was approved by 60.9% of voters. The third on 8 December was on an initiative on hunting law, and was approved by 51% of voters.

Results

New tax law

Land surveying law initiative

Hunting law initiative

References

1961 referendums
1961 in Liechtenstein
1961
Hunting referendums